Olasupo Shasore (born 22 January 1964) is a legal practitioner and a founding partner in the law firm of Africa Law Practice NG & Co, a commercial law firm in Nigeria. A Senior Advocate of Nigeria (SAN) and a Fellow of the Chartered Institute of Arbitrators. He was Attorney General & Commissioner for Justice, Lagos State from 2007 – 2011.

Education
Shasore attended the Federal Government College Lagos and Igbobi College, Lagos before studying law at the University of Ife (now Obafemi Awolowo University) graduating with an LL.B in 1986 followed by a Bachelor of Laws from Nigerian Law School in 1987. He then achieved an LL.M through the University of Lagos in 1990.

Career
He was called to the Nigerian Bar on 22 October 1987; Became a member of the Inner Bar and conferred with the rank of Senior Advocate of Nigeria (SAN) in 2006; Fellow of the Chartered Institute of Arbitrators (United Kingdom) 2007; Former member of the Body of Benchers of Nigeria; Notary Public for Nigeria; President of the Lagos Court of Arbitration (LCA) (until January 2016); Chairman of the Lagos State Law Reform Commission (until 2015); Member/Secretary of the Presidential Petroleum Revenue Special Taskforce (2013); Led Lagos State delegates at National Constitutional conference (2014)

As Attorney General & Commissioner for Justice, Lagos State, he led the review of the Criminal Code Law, and the Administration of Criminal Justice Law; Authored and issued the first Prosecutors' Guidelines (2011); Initiated the first African Regional Conference of the International Association of Prosecutors (IAP). Chaired the Mortgage and Property Law Reform Committee, which produced and recommended the Mortgage & Property Law (2009). He also authored the Home Ownership and Mortgage Policy (2011). He also initiated the policy and crafted the tenant friendly Tenancy Law of Lagos State, balancing the inequality between landlords and tenants.

Writings 
He is also an historian and author, his recent books include Ministering Justice: Administration of Justice in Nigeria (Qbooks, 2019); Platter of Gold: Making Nigeria (2016); Possessed – A History of Law & Justice in the Crown Colony of Lagos (2014); Commercial Arbitration – Arbitration Law & International Practice in Nigeria (Lexis Nexis, 2011), Johnson and Shasore; Jurisdiction & Sovereign Immunity in Nigerian Commercial Law (Practice and textbook) (2007, NIIA).

Personal life 
Shasore is married with three children.

References 
 

Living people
1964 births
People from Lagos
Obafemi Awolowo University alumni
University of Lagos alumni
Igbobi College alumni
Attorneys General of Lagos State
Commissioners of ministries of Lagos State
21st-century Nigerian lawyers
Residents of Lagos